Tadeusz Michejda (26 September 1879 in Nawsie – 18 May 1956 in Warsaw) was a Polish physician and politician from the region of Cieszyn Silesia.

Tadeusz Michejda was born to Franciszek Michejda, a Lutheran pastor, and Anna Roiczek. He graduated from a state gymnasium in Cieszyn and later studied medicine at universities in Kraków, Prague and Vienna. After graduation, Michejda worked as a doctor in Vienna and Tuchów, later becoming a municipal doctor in Horní Suchá.

After World War I he was a member of Rada Narodowa Księstwa Cieszyńskego (National Council of the Duchy of Cieszyn) and worked on preparations to hold a plebiscite in Cieszyn Silesia. In 1920 Cieszyn Silesia was divided between Czechoslovakia and Poland. His hometown and the workplace fell to Czechoslovakia and Kiedroń left the Zaolzie area as he was an active pro-Polish activist; he stayed in Poland, where he worked many years in several localities, including Działdowo, as a doctor. He was a senator in the Polish Senate for the National Workers' Party from 1930 to 1935, deputy in the State National Council in 1945–1946 and deputy in the Sejm from 1947 to 1952. Michejda was also a Minister of Health from 1947 to 1951 and a Minister without Portfolio from 1951 to 1952. Michejda was since 1950 a member of the Democratic Party, and a vice-chairman of the Polish Red Cross. Tadeusz Michejda died in Warsaw and is buried at the Rakowicki Cemetery in Kraków.

Footnotes

References

1879 births
1956 deaths
People from Frýdek-Místek District
People from Austrian Silesia
Polish people from Zaolzie
Polish Lutherans
National League (Poland) members
National Workers' Party politicians
Labor Party (Stronnictwo Pracy) politicians
Alliance of Democrats (Poland) politicians
Health ministers of Poland
Senators of the Second Polish Republic (1930–1935)
Members of the State National Council
Members of the Polish Sejm 1947–1952
Polish Freemasons
Polish general practitioners
Austro-Hungarian military personnel of World War I
Silesian Uprisings participants
Commanders with Star of the Order of Polonia Restituta
Grand Crosses of the Order of the White Lion
Burials at Rakowicki Cemetery